Hyundai IHL Co., Ltd. is an automotive components manufacturing company headquartered in Gyeongju, South Korea. It was established in 1993 as Inhee Industrial Co. and changed its name to IHL in 2005. Its principal products are car lights.

References

https://web.archive.org/web/20110726114213/http://www.hankyung.com/news/app/newsview.php?aid=2008011466141

External links
 Hyundai IHL official site

Auto parts suppliers of South Korea
Hyundai Motor Group